Jennifer J. Johnson is an American legal scholar and academic administrator who has worked as the dean of the Lewis & Clark Law School in Portland, Oregon, since 2014. Johnson specializes in business and securities law.

Education 
After graduating from South Salem High School, Johnson earned a Bachelor of Arts degree from Mills College in 1973 and a Juris Doctor from Yale Law School in 1976.

Career 
After graduating from law school, Johnson clerked for Judge Alfred Goodwin on the United States District Court for the District of Oregon. Johnson then entered private practice at Stoel Rives in Portland, where she specialized in real estate finance and land use law, before joining the faculty of Lewis & Clark Law School in 1980. She was named Dean of the Law School in 2014. Johnson is a member of the Oregon State Bar, and was elected to the American Law Institute in 2008.

References 

Living people
Year of birth missing (living people)
Lawyers from Portland, Oregon
American legal scholars
Lewis & Clark College
Lewis & Clark College faculty
Mills College alumni
Yale Law School alumni
Oregon lawyers